Ayogya is a 2019 Indian Tamil-language action film written and directed by Venkat Mohan. An official remake of the 2015 Telugu-language film Temper, the film follows a corrupt police officer whose life changes when he commits his first act of heroism that brings a rape case to his attention. Produced by B. Madhu through his company Light House Movie Makers, the film stars Vishal in the lead role along with Raashii Khanna, R. Parthiban, K. S. Ravikumar, Pavithra Lokesh, Yogi Babu, Anandaraj, and Pooja Devariya. The film's soundtrack was composed by Sam C. S., while cinematography and editing was handled by V. I. Karthik and Ruben respectively.

Initially scheduled to release on 10 April 2019, Ayogya was released on 10 May 2019, along with Malayalam and Kannada dubs - the former under the same title as the original Tamil version and the latter as Rowdy Police. Upon its release, the film received generally positive reviews from critics who praised Vishal's and R.Parthiban’s performance, action sequences and the changed climax.

Plot
Having believed a police officer's life to be luxurious, with much income in the form of bribes, Karnan, an orphan, grows up to become a corrupt and ruthless Sub-Inspector. He forms an immediate friendship with the local don ECR Kaalirajan by releasing his four brothers Kumar, Prakash, Vinay, and Sabari from lock-up, who were all arrested for smuggling. Karnan's attitude does not go well with his subordinate Abdul Kader, a sincere police constable. In vain as it is, he tries to oppose Karnan's deeds.

Meanwhile, Karnan meets and falls in love with Sindhu, who gets kidnapped by Kaalirajan's men on her birthday but is rescued in time by Karnan. Kaalirajan then scolds his henchmen for kidnapping the wrong person and apologizes to both of them. As her birthday gift, Sindhu requests Karnan to save the girl who was supposed to be kidnapped and killed by Kaalirajan. A reluctant Karnan fights Kaalirajan's goons and saves the girl, Sandhya. Karnan somehow reconciles with Kaalirajan later and learns that Sandhya has certain evidence against Kaalirajan's brothers. Karnan meets her and learns that her sister Bhavani was kidnapped, raped, and brutally assaulted to death by Kaalirajan's four brothers for two weeks, and this act was recorded by them. The footage was stored on a camera, which is with Sandhya now. Karnan takes the camera and arranges to send both Sandhya and her mother to the States.

Before their departure, Sandhya's conversation with Karnan leaves him shattered. Realizing that he was indeed responsible for the rape since he allowed the brothers to escape on the day they kidnapped Bhavani, Karnan is devastated and soon realizes that he has reformed after he fights off Kaalirajan's goons sent to retrieve the camera at the police station, with Kader notifying the change in him. He soon manages to track the brothers and beat them all up before arresting them. After Bhavani's corpse is found and the autopsy is performed, Karnan produces the camera as the evidence, which turns out to be an empty one. Though no further evidence exists, Karnan asks for a gap of one day to provide necessary evidence so that Kaalirajan's brothers do not escape as exonerated. Later, Kaalirajan's men attack a drunk Karnan when he is alone. After a brutal fight, they bury him alive, but he manages to escape.

Karnan reaches the court the next day, and to everyone's shock, he adds that he is one among not the four, but "five" men who sexually assaulted Bhavani. He then convinces the judge to sentence all five of them to capital punishment in order to ensure that the other four do not escape punishment. This statement shakes the entire course of the case, and Karnan is publicly resented. He is allowed by the commissioner to watch as all four of the brothers are hanged, after which he, too, is hanged. Merely hours later, Sandhya and her mother arrive in Chennai, publicly revealing Karnan's innocence and the sacrifice he made to ensure punishment to all of the accused criminals. The revelation shocks the nation, and the public who misunderstood him eventually mourns his death as his corpse is brought and walked from the gallows. The film ends with Karnan's final words; "All men will now fear an immediate death sentence, if they ever molest a girl."

Cast

Production 
In September 2017, Vishal confirmed that he would be acting in the remake of Telugu film Temper. The film is directed by Venkat Mohan, a former assistant of A. R. Murugadoss. The film was launched on 23 August 2018 and the shoot began on ECR in the same day. With Raashi Khanna was announced as female lead, it is her third film in Tamil. Filming took place in and around Vishakhapatnam and Tuticorin while some minor portions were shot around Chennai and Pondicherry.

Soundtrack 

The film's soundtrack are composed by Sam C. S., with one song, "Vera Level", composed by S. Thaman. The songs "Kanne Kanne" and "Vera Level" are remixed from the Telugu songs "Kanne Kanne" and "Blockbuster" from Arjun Suravaram and Sarrainodu. The audio rights of the film are secured by Lahari Music.

Release 
The film was scheduled for release on 11 January 2019 coinciding with the Pongal weekend, but got delayed. Finally, the film released on 10 May 2019.

Critical reception 
Ayogya received generally positive reviews from the audience and critics. Behindwoods rated 3/5 and stated that, "An unexpected good climax makes Ayogya standout a notch high". Thinkal Menon of TOI rated 3/5 and stated that "Ayogya is more or less the same as its original version, including the characterisations and locations, except for the unexpected climax." It received positive reviews from critics who praised Vishal's performance.

References

External links 
 

2019 films
2019 action drama films
2019 crime action films
Indian action drama films
Indian crime action films
Indian police films
Films about corruption in India
Films scored by Sam C. S.
Films scored by Thaman S
Films about rape in India
Tamil remakes of Telugu films
Fictional portrayals of the Tamil Nadu Police